Northwestern Krai was a krai of the Russian Empire (unofficial subdivision) in the territories of the former Grand Duchy of Lithuania (present-day Belarus and Lithuania). The administrative center was in Vilna (Vilnius). Northwestern Krai together with the Southwestern Krai, which was composed of the territories formerly belonging to the Polish Crown (in present-day Ukraine), formed the Western Krai. 

It included six :
Governorate-General of Vilna:
Vilna Governorate
Kovno Governorate
Grodno Governorate
Minsk Governorate
Mogilev Governorate
Vitebsk Governorate

See also
Southwestern Krai
Western Krai

References 
 Шафарик, П.И. Славянское народописание / П.И. Шафарик; пер. с чешского И.Бодянского. — М. : Университетская типография, 1843. — 182 с.
 Ширяев, Е.Е. Беларусь: Русь Белая, Русь Черная и Литва в картах / Е.Е. Ширяев. — Минск : Навука і тэхніка, 1991. — 119 с.
 Rodkiewicz, W. Russian Nationality Policy in the Western Provinces of the Empire (1863—1905) / W. Rodkiewicz. — Lublin: Scientific Society of Lublin, 1998. — 257 s.
 Staliunas, Darius. Making Russians. Meaning and Practice of Russification in Lithuania and Belarus after 1863 / D. Staliunas. — Amsterdam—New York : Rodopi, 2007. — 465 s.
 Szpoper, Dariusz. Sukcesorzy Wielkiego Księstwa. Myśl polityczna i działalność konserwatystów polskich na ziemiach litewsko-białoruskich w latach 1904—1939 / D. Szpoper. — Gdańsk : Arche, 1999. — 357 s.
 Weeks, T.R. Nation and State in Late Imperial Russia. Nationalism and Russification on the Western Frontier, 1863—1914 / T.R. Weeks. — DeKalb: Northern Illinois University Press, 1996.

Krais of the Russian Empire